Marcelo dos Santos (born 10 September 1972 in Telêmaco Borba) is a Paralympic boccia player of Brazil who competes in the BC4 category. He took up the sport in 2016 Paralympics he won individual bronze medals and shared gold medals in pairs with Dirceu Pinto and Eliseu dos Santos.

References

1972 births
Living people
Boccia players at the 2016 Summer Paralympics
Paralympic silver medalists for Brazil
Paralympic boccia players of Brazil
People from Telêmaco Borba
Medalists at the 2016 Summer Paralympics
Paralympic medalists in boccia
Medalists at the 2015 Parapan American Games
Medalists at the 2019 Parapan American Games
Sportspeople from Paraná (state)